Lan Xiaoling (born 22 May 1993) is a Chinese handball player. She plays on the Chinese national team, and participated at the 2011 World Women's Handball Championship in Brazil.

References

1993 births
Living people
Chinese female handball players
Handball players at the 2018 Asian Games
Asian Games silver medalists for China
Asian Games medalists in handball
Medalists at the 2018 Asian Games